This article lists the winners of the monthly awards in the Scottish Professional Football League.

2013–14 season

2014–15 season

2015–16 season

2016–17 season

2017–18 season

2018–19 season

2019–20 season

2020–21 season

2021–22 season

2022–23 season

See also
 Scottish Football League monthly awards
 Scottish Premier League monthly awards
 Scottish Professional Football League yearly awards

References

Scottish Professional Football League
Awards
Scottish Professional Football League